Unbridled is a 2017 film, released theatrically in 2019, about redemption and triumph through horse-human friendship directed by John David Ware. The film stars Eric Roberts, T.C. Stallings, Téa Mckay, Jenn Gotzon, Dey Young, Rachel Hendrix and David Topp. The music score of the film is done by David C Williams and an original song in the film is composed by Jibin George Sebastian.

References

2017 films
American drama films
2017 drama films
2010s English-language films
2010s American films